The European Association of Archaeologists (EAA) is a membership-based, not-for-profit association, open to archaeologists and other related or interested individuals or bodies in Europe and beyond. It was founded in 1994 at an inaugural meeting in Ljubljana, Slovenia, where its statutes were formally approved, and recognized by the Council of Europe in 1999. EAA has had over 11,000 members on its database from 60 countries worldwide, working in prehistory, classical, medieval, and historic archaeology. EAA holds an annual conference and publishes the flagship journal of European archaeology, the European Journal of Archaeology. The EAA also publishes an in-house newsletter, The European Archaeologist (TEA). The registered office of the association is in Prague, Czech Republic.

Mission
The EAA sets the professional and ethical standards of archaeological work through its statutes, code of practice, principles of conduct for contract archaeology, and code of practice for fieldwork training. The EAA Communities help define important aspects of archaeological work through constant discussion and consultation with EAA membership at EAA annual conferences. The EAA further promotes international cooperation though interactions with Affiliate Organizations. In 1999, the EAA was granted consultative status with the Council of Europe, which in 2003 was upgraded to participatory status.

The EAA aims are to:
 to promote the development of archaeological research and the exchange of archaeological information;
 to promote the management and interpretation of the European archaeological heritage;
 to promote proper ethical and scientific standards for archaeological work;
 to promote the interests of professional archaeologists in Europe;
 to promote cooperation with other organizations with similar aims.

Governance
The EAA is governed by an executive board elected by full members of the association. The executive board comprises three or four officers (president, incoming president, treasurer, and secretary) and six ordinary members. The current president is Eszter Bánffy and former presidents include:

 Kristian Kristiansen (1994–1998)
 Willem Willems (1998–2003)
 Anthony Harding (2003–2009)
 Friedrich Lüth (2009–2014)
 Felipe Criado-Boado (2014–2021)

Awards
The EAA awards prizes and honours relevant to its aims. These include the European Archaeological Heritage Prize, the EAA Student Award, and Honorary membership in the EAA.

European Archaeological Heritage Prize 
The EAA instituted the European Archaeological Heritage Prize in 1999. An independent committee awards the prize annually to an individual, institution, (local or regional) government or a (European or international) officer or body for an outstanding contribution to the protection and presentation of the European archaeological heritage.

 1999: M.M. Carrilho, Minister of Culture from Portugal
 2000: Margareta Biörnstad, former state antiquarian, Sweden 
 2001: Otto Braasch, member of the Aerial Archaeological Group (AARG), Germany 
 2002: Henry Cleere, ICOMOS Paris 
 2003: Viktor Trifonov, Institute of Material Culture, Russian Academy of Sciences in Sankt Petersburg 
 2004: Illicit Antiquities Research Centre at the McDonald Institute for Archaeological Research at the University of Cambridge 
 2005: Kristian Kristiansen, Sweden 
 2006: John Coles, UK 
 2007: Siegmar von Schnurbein, Germany 
 2008: Jean-Paul Demoule, France 
 2009: Ulrich Ruoff, Switzerland 
 2010: David John Breeze, Scotland
 2011: Girolamo Ferdinando, UK and Avvocato Francesco Pinto, Italy
 2012: Willem J.H. Willems, Dean of the Faculty of Archaeology, University of Leiden, Netherlands 
 2013: M. Daniel Thérond, former Head of Department of the Culture, Heritage and Diversity Department, Council of Europe, and Vincent Gaffney
 2014: Marie Louise Stig Sørensen and Erzsébet Jerem
 2015: María Ángeles Querol Fernández and Martin Oswald Hugh Carver
 2016: Unité d'Archéologie de la Ville de Saint-Denis and Caroline Sturdy Colls
 2017: Unità di Crisi e di Coordinamento Regionale Marche del Ministero dei beni e delle attività culturali e del turismo
 2018: Ivan Pavlů and Francisco Javier Sánchez-Palencia Ramos
 2019: Osman Kavala and Fundación Catedral Santa María, Vitoria-Gasteiz, Basque country, Spain

Student award 
A student award was instituted in 2002 and is awarded annually for the best paper presented at the EAA Annual Meeting by a student or an archaeologist working on a dissertation.

 2002 - Laura M. Popova
 2003 - Anita Synnestvedt
 2004 - Jonathan D. Le Huray
 2005 - Marta Caroscio 
 2006 - NOT AWARDED 
 2007 - Goce Naumov 
 2008 - NOT AWARDED 
 2009 - Pamela Cross 
 2010 - Camilla Norman 
 2011 - Heide Wrobel Norgaard
 2012 - Maria Leena Lahtinen 
 2013 - Oliver Dietrich 
 2014 - Can Aksoy and Ziyacan Bayar 
 2015 - Patrycja Kupiec, and special commendation to Christine Cave and Alex Davies 
 2016 - Sian Mui and Shumon Hussain
 2017 - Emma Brownlee and Yftinus van Popta
 2018 - Hanna Kivikero

Annual meetings
The EAA inaugural meeting took place in Ljubljana, Slovenia in September 1994. The official first annual meeting took place in September 1995 in Santiago de Compostela, Spain, and an annual meeting has taken place every year since. The table below shows the meeting locations and dates.

* Those marked with an asterisk are upcoming

Publications
The EAA publishes the quarterly European Journal of Archaeology (EJA), originally the Journal of European Archaeology (1993–1997), the monograph series THEMES In Contemporary Archaeology, and an electronic newsletter, The European Archaeologist (TEA). EJA is currently co-edited by Catherine J. Frieman and Zena Kamash.

References

External links

European Journal of Archaeology 
The European Archaeologist(TEA) Newsletter of the EAA

Archaeological organizations
Archaeological professional associations
Cultural organizations based in Europe
European archaeology
Organizations established in 1994